Richard Rowan Rockingham Gill (born 1944, South Africa) was a lecturer of philosophy—in particular, logic—and is an author.

Rockingham Gill received a MA from the University of St Andrews and has published variously in the Journal of Symbolic Logic, Archiv für mathematische Logik und Grundlagenforschung (Archive for Mathematical Logic and Basic Research) and other journals.

He lectured at the University of Wales, Lampeter and is also the former head of the Department of Philosophy.

Publications

Articles
 The Craig-Lyndon Interpolation Theorem in 3-Valued Logic, The Journal of Symbolic Logic, Vol. 35, No. 2 (Jun., 1970),  pp. 230–238
 Soviet Oil in the 1980s: Shortage or Surplus?, The RUSI Journal, Vol. 121, No. 2 (Jun., 1976), pp. 73–77
 On Wandschneider's Way Out, Ratio, Vol. 19, No. 1 (1977), pp. 85–87
 Frege on Infinite Axiom-Systems, Analysis, Vol. 47, No. 3 (Jun., 1987), pp. 173–175
 The Logic of Common Nouns, Philosophical Books, Vol. 23, No. 4 (Feb., 2009), pp 243–244

Book reviews
 Modern Logic—a survey. Historical, Philosophical, and Mathematical Aspects of Modern Logic and its Applications. Edited by Evandro Agazzi, Mind, New Series, Vol. 92, No. 366 (Apr., 1983), pp. 286–288

Books
 Deducibility and Decidability, Routledge: 1990

Reviews
Hart, W.D., Deducibility and Decidability. By R. R. Rockingham Gill., The Philosophical Quarterly, Vol. 41, No. 163 (Apr., 1991), pp. 242–243
Visser, Albert, Deducibility and Decidability. By R. R. Rockingham Gill., The Journal of Symbolic Logic, Vol. 58, No. 3 (Sep., 1993), pp. 1080–1082

Rockingham Gill, R.R.
Rockingham Gill, R.R.
Rockingham Gill, R.R.
Rockingham Gill, R.R.
Rockingham Gill, R.R.
Academics of the University of Wales, Lampeter
South African emigrants to the United Kingdom